William Robinson (fl. 1559) of Bath, Somerset was an English politician.

He was a Member (MP) of the Parliament of England for Bath in 1559.

References

Year of birth missing
Year of death missing
English MPs 1559
People from Bath, Somerset